Verrucaria is a genus of lichenized (lichen-forming) fungi in the family Verrucariaceae.

Taxonomy
The genus was circumscribed by German botanist Heinrich Adolph Schrader in 1794, with Verrucaria rupestris assigned as the type species. In his brief diagnosis of the genus, Schrader mentioned the more or less spherical (subglobose), closed ascomata, and the crustose thallus. The genus name is derived from the Latin word verruca (meaning "wart") and the suffix -aria (meaning "belonging to" or "possession").

Ecology
As of 2015, there were 16 Verrucaria species classified as marine species: V. adguttata, V. allantoidea, V. ceuthocarpa, V. corallensi, V. ditmarsica, V. erichsenii,
V. halizoa, V. halochlora, V. microsporoides, V. paulula, V. psychrophila,
V. sandstedei, V. serpuloides, V. sessilis, V. subdiscreta, and  V. thalassina.

Species

 Verrucaria ahtii – Finland
 Verrucaria kiyosumiensis – Japan
 Verrucaria nigrescens – widespread
 Verrucaria oulankaensis – Finland
 Verrucaria rhizicola – France
 Verrucaria rupestris
 Verrucaria serpuloides – a permanently submerged marine lichen in Antarctica
 Verrucaria takagoensis – Japan
 Verrucaria vitikainenii – Finland

Distribution
Verrucaria ditmarsica has been recorded in 1984 from the Lighthouse Island, Copeland Island, County Down, Northern Ireland.

See also 

 Hydropunctaria maura, formerly Verrucaria maura, one of the most widespread lichens on the European littoral zone and found worldwide

References

 
Eurotiomycetes genera
Lichen genera
Taxa described in 1794
Taxa named by Heinrich Schrader (botanist)